Kozyatağı is an underground transfer station for the M4 line and the M8 line of the Istanbul Metro. Located under beneath the D.100 state highway in Kozyatağı, it was opened on 17 August 2012 for the M4 and on 6 January 2023 for the M8 line.

The construction of the transfer tunnel between the two stations continues.

For now, the transition between the lines is made by going up to the earth and descending again.

Station Layout

References

External links
Kozyatağı station portal in Google Street View

Railway stations opened in 2012
Istanbul metro stations
2012 establishments in Turkey